The 1902 Coronation Honours were announced on 26 June 1902, the date originally set for the coronation of King Edward VII. The coronation was postponed because the King had been taken ill two days before, but he ordered that the honours list should be published on that day anyway.

The list included appointments to various orders and honours of the United Kingdom and British India, and the creation of two new decorations:
 the Order of Merit
 the Imperial Service Order

The first Companions of the Imperial Service Orders were not announced until the following November Birthday Honours list, however.

There were also some promotions and appointments in the British Army announced in the list.

The honours were covered in the press at the time, including in The Times on the day, but formal announcements in the London Gazette were spread out over the following months, in gazettes dated 26 June 1902, 11 July 1902, 18 July 1902, 22 July 1902, 25 July 1902, and 2 September 1902.

A South African list, honouring people for their service during the Second Boer War, was published on the same day.

Order of the Garter

The Duke of Wellington, GCVO
The Duke of Sutherland

Order of the Thistle

The Duke of Roxburghe, MVO
The Earl of Haddington

Order of St Patrick

The Earl of Enniskillen
Lord de Ros

Peerages

Marquess
The Earl of Hopetoun, KT, GCMG, GCVO, Governor-General of the Commonwealth of Australia, created Marquess of Linlithgow

Viscount
Lord Colville of Culross, KT, GCVO, created Viscount Colville of Culross
Lord Churchill, KCVO, created Viscount Churchill
Lord Milner, GCB, GCMG, created Viscount Milner

Baron
The Lord Justice-General of Scotland, created Baron Kinross
The Right Honourable Sir Ughtred Kay-Shuttleworth, MP, created Baron Shuttleworth
The Right Honourable William L. Jackson, MP, created Baron Allerton
The Right Honourable Arthur Smith-Barry, created Baron Barrymore
General Sir Francis Grenfell, GCB, GCMG, created Baron Grenfell
Sir Francis Knollys, GCVO, KCB, KCMG, created Baron Knollys
Algernon B. Freeman-Mitford, Esq., CB, CVO, created Baron Redesdale

Privy Council
 Ronald Leslie-Melville, 11th Earl of Leven
 Gilbert Elliot-Murray-Kynynmound, 4th Earl of Minto, GCMG, Governor-General of the Dominion of Canada
 Nathan Rothschild, 1st Baron Rothschild
 William Thomson, 1st Baron Kelvin, GCVO, FRS
 Joseph Lister, 1st Baron Lister, FRS
 Sir Edward Grey, Bart., MP
 Sir John Dorington, Bart., MP
 Sir Hugh MacDonell, GCMG, CB
 Sir Antony MacDonnell, GCSI
 Sir Alfred Lyall, GCIE, KCB
 Lieutenant-Colonel Honourable Sir Albert Hime, KCMG (Premier of Natal)
 Honourable Sir Robert Bond, KCMG (Premier of Newfoundland)
 Sir Ernest Cassel, KCMG, KCVO
 Richard B. Haldane, Esq., KC, MP
 Arthur Jeffreys, Esq., MP
 James Round, Esq., MP

Privy Council of Ireland
 James Butler, 3rd Marquess of Ormonde, KP
 John Crichton, 4th Earl Erne, KP
 Anthony Nugent, 11th Earl of Westmeath
 Mr. Justice (John) Ross
 Mr. Justice (William) Kenny
 Jonathan Hogg
 Daniel Dixon, Lord Mayor of Belfast

Baronets
The Right Honourable Andrew Marshall Porter, Master of the Rolls in Ireland
Sir Joseph Dimsdale, Lord Mayor of the City of London
Colonel Sir Edward Bradford, GCB, KCSI
Sir Andrew Noble, KCB
Sir Francis Evans, KCMG, MP
Sir Francis Laking, KCVO, MD
Sir Thomas Lipton, KCVO
Sir Frederick Treves, KCVO, CB, FRCS, Honorary Serjeant-Surgeon to His Majesty
Sir Hubert Parry, Mus. Doc.
Sir George Lewis
Sir Edward Poynter, President of the Royal Academy
Sir Thomas Jackson
Alexander Henderson, Esq., MP
Robert Hermon-Hodge, Esq., MP
Philip A. Muntz, Esq., MP
Charles Bright McLaren, Esq., MP
William E. Tomlinson, Esq., MP

Knights Bachelor
John Charles Bell, Sheriff of the City of London
Horace Brooks Marshall, Sheriff of the City of London
William Allan, Esq., MP
Francis Cowley Burnand, Esq.
Caspar Purdon Clarke, Esq., CIE
William Laird Clowes, Esq.
William Job Collins, Esq., MD, FRCS
Alfred Cooper, Esq., FRCS
John Halliday Croom, Esq., President of the Royal College of Surgeons (Edinburgh)
Thomas Dewar, Esq., MP
Arthur Conan Doyle, Esq., MD
William Emerson, Esq., President of the Royal Society of British Architects
Colonel Aubone George Fife, Standard Bearer of His Majesty's Bodyguard of Gentlemen at Arms
Thomas Firbank, Esq., MP
Thomas Fraser, Esq., FRS, MD, President of the Royal College of Physicians of Edinburgh
William Henry Holland, Esq., MP
Samuel Hall, Esq., KC, Vice-Chancellor of the Duchy of Lancaster
Colonel Reginald Hennell, DSO, Adjutant of His Majesty's Bodyguard of Yeomen of the Guard
Victor Horsley, Esq., FRS, FRCS
Henry G. Howse, Esq., President of the Royal College of Surgeons
Joseph Lawrence, Esq., MP
Ralph Littler, Esq., CB, KC
George Livesey, Esq.
Oliver Lodge, Esq., FRS
Henry Bell Longhurst, Esq., Hon. Surgeon-Dentist to His Majesty
John Henry Luscombe, Esq., Chairman of Lloyd's
John McDougall, Esq., chairman, London County Council
Professor William Macewen, FRS, FRCS
William Mather, Esq., MP
Isambard Owen, Esq., MD, Senior Deputy Chancellor of the University of Wales
Gilbert Parker, Esq., MP
Paynton Pigott, Esq., Chief Constable of Norfolk
Arthur Rücker, Esq., FRS, Principal of the University of London
William J. Soulsby, Esq., CB, CIE
Charles Villiers Stanford, Esq., Mus. Doc.
Alfred Thomas, Esq., MP
John Thornycroft, Esq., FRS
Ernest Waterlow, Esq., A.R.A., President of the Royal Society of Painters in Water Colours
Joseph Loftus Wilkinson, Esq., General Manager, Great Western Railway
Guy Fleetwood Wilson, Esq., CB, Assistant Under-Secretary of State, War Office
Charles Wyndham, Esq.

British Empire
C. Paul Chater, Esq., CMG, Member of the Executive and Legislative Council, Hong Kong
Honourable James Liege Hulett, Speaker of the Legislative Assembly, Natal
Willem van Hulsteyn, Esq., of Johannesburg
Henri Taschereau, Esq., Judge of the Supreme Court, Canada
Honourable Robert Boak, President of the Legislative Council of Nova Scotia
Honourable Edward Dalton Shea, President of the Legislative Council of Newfoundland
Edward Albert Stone, Esq., Chief Justice of Western Australia
Honourable J. Lancelot Stirling, President of the Legislative Council of South Australia
Honourable Henry McLaurin, Chancellor of the University of Sydney
Honourable Arthur Rutledge, Attorney-General of Queensland
Honourable A. Thorpe-Douglas, President of the Legislative Council of Tasmania
William Russell Russell, Esq., Member of the House of Representatives, New Zealand
John Logan Campbell, Esq., late Mayor of Auckland, New Zealand

Ireland
 John George Barton, Esq., CB, Commissioner of Valuation
 James Brown Dougherty, Esq., CB, Assistant Under-Secretary for Ireland
 John Hamilton Franks, Esq., CB, Secretary of the Irish Land Commission
 Francis Henry Miller, Mayor of Londonderry
 Thomas Myles, Esq., MB, President of the Royal College of Surgeons in Ireland
 Vincent Nash, Esq., High Sheriff of Limerick City
 George Roche, Esq., past President of the Incorporated Law Society of Ireland
 John Olphert, Esq.
 Dr. William Whitla, MD
 James Murphy, Esq., President of Chamber of Commerce, Dublin

Order of Merit

The King has been pleased to institute an Order of Merit, to which His Majesty, as Sovereign of the Order, has made the following appointments:
 Field Marshal Frederick Roberts, 1st Earl Roberts, KG, KP, VC
 Field Marshal Garnet Wolseley, 1st Viscount Wolseley, KP, GCB
 General Herbert Kitchener, Viscount Kitchener of Khartoum, GCB, GCMG
 John William Strutt, 3rd Baron Rayleigh, FRS
 William Thomson, 1st Baron Kelvin, GCVO, FRS
 Joseph Lister, 1st Baron Lister, FRS
 Admiral of the Fleet the Honourable Sir Henry Keppel, GCB
 The Right Honourable John Morley, MP
 The Right Honourable William Edward Hartpole Lecky, MP
 Admiral Sir Edward Hobart Seymour, GCB
 Sir William Huggins, KCB, PRS
 George Frederic Watts, Esq., RA

The Most Honourable Order of the Bath

Knight Grand Cross of the Order of the Bath (GCB) 
 Military Division
Admiral Lord Walter Talbot Kerr, KCB
Admiral Sir John Arbuthnot Fisher, KCB
Vice-Admiral Sir Frederick George Denham Bedford, KCB
Admiral the Right Honourable Sir John Charles Dalrymple Hay, Bart., KCB (Retired)
Admiral Sir William Graham, KCB (Retired)
Admiral Sir Algernon Charles Fieschi Heneage, KCB (Retired)
Admiral Sir Alexander Buller, KCB (Retired)
General Sir Richard Chambre Hayes Taylor, KCB
General Sir Harry North Dalrymple Prendergast, VC, KCB, Unemployed Supernumerary list, Royal (late Madras) Engineers
General Sir John Watson, VC, KCB, Unemployed Supernumerary list, Indian Staff Corps
Lieutenant-General Sir Robert Hume, KCB
General Sir Martin Dillon, KCB, CSI
General Sir Reginald Gibbs, KCB
Lieutenant-General Sir Robert Grant, KCB
 Civil Division
 Edward Hyde Villiers, 5th Earl of Clarendon, PC, Lord Chamberlain
 The Right Honourable Sir Francis Henry Jeune, KCB, PC, Judge Advocate General
 The Right Honourable Sir Algernon Edward West, KCB, PC
 General the Right Honourable Sir Dighton Macnaghten Probyn, VC, GCVO, KCB, KCSI, PC,

Knights Commander of the Order of the Bath (KCB) 
 Military Division
Admiral Sir Erasmus Ommanney, CB (Retired)
Admiral St George Caulfield d'Arcy-Irvine, CB (Retired)
Vice-Admiral Hilary Gustavus Andoe, CB
Vice-Admiral Arthur Knyvet Wilson, VC, CB
Vice-Admiral Archibald Lucius Douglas
Vice-Admiral Sir Gerard Henry Uctred Noel, KCMG
Rear-Admiral Arthur William Moore, CB, CMG
General Samuel James Graham, CB (Retired)
Major-General John Frederick Crease, CB (Retired)
Inspector-General of Hospitals and Fleets John Denis Macdonald, MD, Royal Navy (Retired)
Chief Inspector of Machinery William Eames, Royal Navy (Retired)
Chief Inspector of Machinery Henry Benbow, Royal Navy, DSO (Retired)
Paymaster-in-Chief James William Murray Ashby, CB (Retired)
Fleet Paymaster Frederick Cleeve, CB (Retired)
Surgeon-General John Andrew Woolfryes, MD, CB, CMG, Honorary Physician to the King
Lieutenant-General Alexander Robert Badcock, CB, CSI, Indian Staff Corps
Surgeon-General Annesley Charles Castriott de Renzy, CB, Indian Medical Service (Retired)
General Rowley Sale Sale-Hil, CB, Unemployed Supernumerary list, Indian Staff Corps
Lieutenant-General Sir Montagu Gilbert Gerrard, KCSI, CB, Indian Staff Corps
Major-General (Honorary) Alexander Bruce Tulloch, CB, CMG
Major-General Reginald Thomas Thynne, CB
Major-General Reginald Arthur James Talbot, CB
Major-General Sir Edward Stedman, KCIE, CB, Indian Staff Corps
Lieutenant-General Thomas Kelly-Kenny, CB
Major-General Alfred Edward Turner, CB
Colonel (ranking as Major-General) John Steevens, CB
Surgeon-General (ranking as Lieutenant-General) William Taylor, MD, CB, Honorary Physician to the King
 Civil Division
Richard Davis Awdry, Esq., CB, Accountant General of the Royal Navy
The Honourable Bernard Eric Barrington, CB
The Honourable Francis Leveson Bertie, Assistant Under-Secretary of State, Foreign Office
Honorary Colonel Charles Gervais Boxall, CB, 1st Sussex Royal Garrison Artillery (Volunteers)
Lieutenant-Colonel and Honorary Colonel Robert Bridgford, CB, late 2nd Volunteer Battalion, Manchester Regiment
Sir William Selby Church, Bart., MD, President of the Royal College of Physicians
Clinton Edward Dawkins, Esq., CB, chairman of the recent Committee upon the administration of the War Office
Thomas Henry Elliott, Esq., CB, Secretary to the Board of Agriculture
Reginald Baliol Brett, 2nd Viscount Esher, KCVO, CB, Secretary to His Majesty's Office of Works
John Lowndes Gorst, Esq., CB, Financial Adviser to the Egyptian Government
Henry John Lowndes Graham, Esq., CB, Clerk of the Parliaments
The Honourable Schomberg Kerr McDonnell, CVO, CB
Henry James van Sittart Neale, Esq., CB, Assistant Secretary to the Admiralty
Major Henry Pilkington, CB, Royal Engineers
Alfred de Bock Porter, Esq., CB, Secretary to the Ecclesiastical Commission
Professor William Ramsay, FRS
Evelyn John Ruggles-Brise, Esq., CB, Chairman of the Prison Commission
Horace A. D. Seymour, Deputy Master of the Royal Mint, Esq., CB (he died before the list was gazetted and was never knighted, his widow was granted the rank of a knight′s widow)
Honorary Colonel Alfred Plantagenet Frederick Charles Somerset, CB, 7th Battalion, Rifle Brigade (Prince Consort's Own)
Leslie Stephen, Esq.
Colonel Arthur Pendarves Vivian, CB, South Wales Borders Volunteer Infantry Brigade
George Whitehouse, Esq., Engineer-in-Chief of the Uganda Railway
Henry Francis Redhead Yorke, Esq., CB, Director of Victualling, Royal Navy

Companions of the Order of the Bath (CB) 
Military division
Captain Edward Harpur Gamble, Royal Navy
Captain Sir George John Scott Warrender, Baronet, Royal Navy
Captain Christopher George Francis Maurice Cradock, Royal Navy
Lieutenant-Colonel George Thorp Onslow, Royal Marine Light Infantry
Lieutenant-Colonel Herbert Cecil Money, Royal Marine Light Infantry
Major and Brevet Lieutenant-Colonel Edward Vyvyan Luke, Royal Marine Light Infantry
Major and Brevet Lieutenant-Colonel George Grey Aston, Royal Marine Artillery
Fleet Surgeon James Porter, MB
Fleet Paymaster Francis Cooke Alton
Paymaster-in-Chief John Samuel Moore (Retired)
Lieutenant-General John Fletcher Owen, Royal Artillery
Major-General George Salis-Schwabe
Colonel Joseph Henry Laye, CVO
Colonel Francis Edward Mulcahy, Army Ordnance Department
Colonel O'Moore Creagh, VC, Indian Staff Corps
Colonel John Davidson, Indian Staff Corps
Colonel William Edmund Franklyn
Colonel Frederick Stapleton Gwatkin, Indian Staff Corps
Colonel Alfred Robert Martin, Indian Staff Corps
Colonel Charles Wemyss Muir, CIE, Indian Staff Corps
Colonel William Robert Le Geyt Anderson, Indian Staff Corps
Lieutenant-Colonel Patrick Fenelon O'Connor, Indian Medical Service
Lieutenant-Colonel Arthur Davidson, CVO, Equerry to the King
Lieutenant-Colonel Robert Ramsay Napier Sturt, Indian Staff Corps
Civil division
Sir John Henry Bergne, KCMG, Foreign Office
William Patrick Byrne, Esq., Home Office
Heffernan Fritz James Joseph John Considine, Deputy Inspector-General, Royal Irish Constabulary
Captain Fritz Hauch Eden Crowe, RN, His Majesty's Consul-General, Lourenco Marques
Alan Cole, Esq., Board of Education
Hugh Bertram Cox, Esq., Assistant Under-Secretary of State, Colonial Office
Major Patrick George Craigie, Assistant Secretary, Board of Agriculture
Henry James Gibson, Esq., Assistant Accountant-General, War Office
Sir Gabriel Prior Goldney, 2nd Baronet, City Remembrancer
Lieutenant-Colonel John Lane Harrington, CVO, His Majesty's Agent and Consul-General in Abyssinia
Honorary Commander John Howson, RNR
Hartmann Wolfgang Just, Esq., CMG, Colonial Office
Horace Cecil Monro, Esq., Assistant Secretary, Local Government Board
Robert Laurie Morant, Esq., Board of Education
George Peter Martin, Esq., RN, late Deputy Judge Advocate of the Fleet
Frank Thomas Marzials, Esq., Account-General of the Army
Augustus Henry Oakes, Esq., Chief Librarian, Foreign Office
Frederick Sydney Parry, Esq., Treasury
Douglas Close Richmond, Esq., Comptroller and Auditor-General
Ronald Ross, Esq., FRS, FRCS
George Watson Smyth, Esq., Assistant Secretary, General Post Office
Lieutenant-Colonel James Hayes Sadler, His Majesty's Commissioner for the Uganda Protectorate
Benjamin Arthur Whitelegge, Esq., MD, FRCP, Chief Inspector of Factories
Colonel Edward Raban, Royal Engineers
Charles Colson, Esq.
Sir James Williamson, Director of Dockyards
James Brown Marshall, Esq.
George Crocker, Esq.
Richard Jago Butler, Esq.
William Winsland Chilcott, Esq., Chief Inspector of Machinery, Royal Navy
William George Littlejohns, Esq., Chief Inspector of Machinery, Royal Navy
Captain George Stanley, Royal Navy (Retired)
James Robert Clark, Esq., Naval Instructor, Royal Navy
Arthur Mason Worthington, Esq., FRS, MA
Duncan Hilston, Esq., MD, Inspector-General of Hospitals and Fleets, Royal Navy (Retired)
Robert Grant, Esq., MB, Inspector-General of Hospitals and Fleets, Royal Navy
Lieutenant Herbert James Haddock, Royal Naval Reserve
Lieutenant Melville Willis Campbell Hepworth, Royal Naval Reserve (Retired)
William Munro Ross, Esq., Royal Naval Reserve
Colonel Robert Auld
Colonel Charles Moore Watson, CMG, late Royal Engineers
Colonel Robert Arthur Montgomery
Colonel William Dunne, Army Service Corps
Lieutenant-Colonel Charles Frederick Hadden
Lieutenant-Colonel and Honorary Colonel Alfred Thrale Perkins, 3rd (Militia) Battalion, Welch Regiment
Lieutenant-Colonel and Honorary Colonel Maitland Moore-Lane (Honorary Lieutenant-Colonel, retired pay), The Duke of Connaught's Own Hampshire and Isle of Wight Royal Garrison Artillery (Militia)
Lieutenant-Colonel Sir James Richardson Andrew Clark, Baronet (Brevet Major), Royal Army Medical Corps (Militia)
Lieutenant-Colonel and Honorary Colonel Clement Molyneux Royds, Duke of Lancaster's Own Imperial Yeomanry
Lieutenant-Colonel Sir Herbert Lloyd Watkin Williams-Wynn, Baronet, Montgomeryshire Imperial Yeomanry
Lieutenant-Colonel and Honorary Colonel John Blencowe Cookson, Northumberland Hussars Imperial Yeomanry
Lieutenant-Colonel and Honorary Colonel Michael B. Pearson, 2nd Middlesex Royal Garrison Artillery (Volunteers)
Lieutenant-Colonel Commandant and Honorary Colonel Frederick Campbell, 1st Argyll and Bute Royal Garrison Artillery (Volunteers)
Lieutenant-Colonel and Honorary Colonel Edwin Vaux, 1st Durham Royal Garrison Artillery (Volunteers)
Lieutenant-Colonel and Honorary Colonel William Mathwin Angus, 1st Newcastle-on-Tyne Royal Garrison Artillery (Volunteers)
Lieutenant-Colonel and Honorary Colonel Richard K. Birley, 7th Lancaster (the Manchester Artillery) Royal Garrison Artillery (Volunteers)
Lieutenant-Colonel and Honorary Colonel Edward Thomas Davenant Cotton-Jodrell, 2nd Cheshire (Railway) Royal Engineers (Volunteers)
Lieutenant-Colonel and Honorary Colonel Robert Henry Anstice (Major, retired pay), 1st Aberdeenshire Royal Engineers (Volunteers)
Lieutenant-Colonel Commandant and Honorary Colonel Robert William Edis, 20th Middlesex (Artists′) Rifle Volunteer Corps
Lieutenant-Colonel Commandant and Honorary Colonel Thomas Mitchell, 2nd Volunteer Battalion the East Lancashire Regiment
Lieutenant-Colonel and Honorary Colonel Henry Samuel Hall, 2nd Volunteer Battalion, the Oxfordshire Light Infantry
Lieutenant-Colonel and Honorary Colonel William Henry Campion, 2nd Volunteer Battalion, the Royal Sussex Regiment
Lieutenant-Colonel and Honorary Colonel John Eaton, 3rd Volunteer Battalion, the Manchester Regiment
Lieutenant-Colonel and Honorary Colonel the Right Honourable Sir John Henry Kennaway, Baronet, 3rd Volunteer Battalion, the Devonshire Regiment
Lieutenant-Colonel George Thomas Beatson, MD, the Glasgow Companies, Royal Army Medical Corps (Volunteers)
Lieutenant-Colonel and Honorary Colonel James Neilson, Lanarkshire (Queen's Own Royal Glasgow) Imperial Yeomanry
Lieutenant-Colonel and Honorary Colonel Henry Frederick Swan, 2nd Volunteer Battalion, the Northumberland Fusiliers
Honorary Colonel Henry Bourchier Osborne Savile (Captain, retired pay), 1st Gloucestershire Royal Garrison Artillery (Volunteers)
Honorary Colonel Stanley George Bird, 1st Middlsex (Victoria and St George's) Volunteer Rifle Corps
Lieutenant-Colonel and Honorary Colonel Edward Matthey, late 1st London Volunteer Rifle Corps
Lieutenant-Colonel and Honorary Colonel Charles Rivers Bulkeley, late 4th Battalion, the Oxfordshire Light Infantry
Lieutenant-Colonel and Honorary Colonel Francis McDonnell, late Royal Monmouthshire Royal Engineers (Militia)
Honorary Colonel Robert Joseph Pratt Saunders, the Mid-Ulster Royal Garrison Artillery (Militia)
Honorary Colonel Gordon Maynard Gordon-Ives, 18th Middlesex Volunteer Rifle Corps

Order of the Star of India

Knight Commander of the Order of the Star of India (KCSI) 
Lieutenant-Colonel David William Keith Barr, CSI, Indian Staff Corps, resident at Hyderabad
Henry John Stedman Cotton, Esq., CSI, Indian Civil Service, Chief Commissioner of Assam
Amaravati Seshayya Sastri, CSI, of Madras

Companion of the Order of the Star of india (CSI)
Thomas Raleigh, Esq., Ordinary Member of the Council of the Governor-General
James Thomson, Esq., Indian Civil Service, Member of the Council of the Governor of Madras
Joseph Bampfylde Fuller, Esq., CIE, Indian Civil Service, Officiating Chief Commissioner in Assam
Lieutenant-Colonel Arthur Parry Thornton, Indian Staff Corps, late Officiating Agent to the Governor-General, in Rajputana Agency
Hartley Kennedy, Esq., Commissioner of Police, Bombay
Edward Charles Ozanne, Esq., Indian Civil Service (retired), Bombay
Edwin Grant Burls, Esq., Director-General of Stores, India Office

Order of Saint Michael and Saint George

Knight Grand Cross of the Order of St Michael and St George (GCMG)
The Right Honourable Sir John Gordon Sprigg, KCMG, Prime Minister of the Cape of Good Hope
The Right Honourable Edmund Barton, KC, Prime Minister of the Commonwealth of Australia
Sir Edwin Henry Egerton, KCB, His Majesty's Minister at Athens
Sir Ernest Mason Satow, KCMG, His Majesty's Minister at Pekin

Knight Commander of the Order of St Michael and St George (KCMG) 
Major Matthew Nathan, Royal Engineers, CMG, Governor and Commander-in-Chief of the Gold Coast Colony
His Honour Daniel Hunter McMillan, Lieutenant Governor of the Province of Manitoba, in Canada
The Honourable Neil Elliot Lewis, MA, BCL, CMG, Prime Minister of the State of Tasmania
The Honourable Frederick William Holder, Speaker of the House of Representatives of the Commonwealth of Australia
The Honourable John See, Prime Minister of the State of New South Wales
The Honourable Alexander James Peacock, late Prime Minister of the State of Victoria
The Honourable Frederick William Borden, MD, Minister of Militia and Defence of the Dominion of Canada
The Honourable William Mulock, KC, LLD, MA, Postmaster General of the Dominion of Canada
Edmund Constantine Henry Phipps, Esq., CB, His Majesty's Minister at Brussels, for services in connection with the Sugar conference
The Honourable Michael Henry Herbert, CB, His Majesty's Ambassador at Washington
Commodore Francis Powell, CB, Royal Navy, for services in China
Pelham Laird Warren, Esq., CMG, His Majesty's Consul-General at Shanghai, for services in China
Surgeon-General Horace Henderson Pinching, Head of the Sanitary Department in Cairo
George Mackenzie, Esq., CB, for services in connection with Persia
Francis Langford O'Callaghan, Esq., CSI, CIE, managing director of the Uganda Railway

Companion of the Order of St Michael and St George (CMG)
Robert Armitage Sterndale, Esq., Governor and Commander-in-Chief of the Island of St Helena
William Lamond Allardyce, Esq., Administrator of the Government of Fiji, assistant Colonial Secretary and Receiver-General
Brevet Colonel (local Major-General) Sir John Grenfell Maxwell, KCB, DSO, for services rendered while Military Governor of Pretoria
The Honourable William McCulloch, late Minister of Health and public Works of the State of Victoria
Captain George Augustus Giffard, Royal Navy for services as Senior Naval Officer engaged in the protection of the Newfoundland Fisheries
Arthur Ashley Parson, Esq., of the Colonial Office, for services as one of the British Delegates at the Sugar Bounties Conference, 1901-02
William Hepworth Mercer, Esq., one of the Crown Agents for the Colonies, for services as Secretary of the Pacific Cable Committees
Henry Francis Wilson, Esq., MA, Secretary to the Administration of the Orange River Colony
Edward Rawle Drayton, Esq., Colonial Secretary and registrar-General of the Island of Grenada
Anthony Musgrave, Esq., Government Secretary of the Possession of British New Guinea
John Kemys George Thomas Spencer-Churchill, Esq., Colonial Secretary of the Bahama Islands
Robert Wilson Levers, Esq., MA, Government Agent of the Northern Province of the Island of Ceylon
Charles Riby Williams, Esq., Treasurer of the Gold Coast colony
Horace Major Brandford Griffith, Esq.,Treasurer of the Colony of The Gambia
Edward Deshon, Esq., Auditor-General of the State of Queensland
Edmund Fosbery, Esq., Inspector-General of Police of the State of New South Wales
George Thompson Hare, Esq., Secretary for Chinese Affairs for the Federation of the Protected States of the Malay Peninsula
Lieutenant-Colonel Frederick White, Comptroller of the North-West Mounted Police in Canada
Edward Fortescue Wright, Esq., Inspector-General of Police and Prisons of the Island of Jamaica
Lieutenant-Colonel Arthur Percy Sherwood, Commissioner of Police in Canada
George Lancelot Eyles, Esq., Consulting Engineer for Railways to the Government of the Colony of the Cape of Good Hope, and to the Crown Agents for the Colonies
John Brown, Esq., M.Inst.C.E., Engineer-in-Chief, Government Railways of the Colony of the Cape of Good Hope
Haslitt Michael Beatty, Esq., Chief Locomotive Superintendent, Government Railways of the Colony of the Cape of Good Hope
William Petch Hewby, Esq., Resident of the First Class in the Protectorate of Northern Nigeria
Frederick Seton James, Esq., Divisional Commissioner in the Protectorate of Southern Nigeria
Lieutenant Francis Bartley Henderson, Royal Navy, DSO, District Commissioner in Ashanti Protectorate
Charles George Harland Bell, Esq., late Civil Commissioner and resident Magistrate, Mafeking, in the Colony of the Cape of Good Hope
Solomon Dias Bandaranaike, Esq., Maha Mudaliyar of the Island of Ceylon
Ricardo Micallef, Esq., Comptroller of Charitable Institutions in the Island of Malta
Joseph Baynes, Esq., Member of the Legislative Assembly of the Colony of Natal
Robert Harris, Esq., President of the Royal Canadian Academy
Richard Darrell Darrell, Esq., Assistant Justice of the Court of General Assize of the Bermuda Islands
William Kellman Chandler, Esq., LLD, Master in Chancery and Senior Judge of the Assistant Court of Appeal of the Island of Barbados
Ernest Leslie Acutt, Esq., Mayor of Durban
John William Leonard, Esq., on retirement as Chief Clerk and Chief Accountant in the office of the Crown Agents for the Colonies
Gustave Albert Ritter, Esq., Unofficial Member of the Council of Government of the Colony of Mauritius
Ho Kai, Esq., Unofficial Member of the Legislative Council of the Colony of Hong Kong
James Miller Farquharson, Esq., Custos of the Parish of St. James, in the Island of Jamaica
John Emrys Evans, Esq., formerly British Vice-Consul at Johannesburg, for services rendered in South Africa
James Donnan, Esq., on retirement as Master Attendant, Colombo, in the Island of Ceylon
Henry Mitchell Hull, Esq., Assistant Colonial Secretary of the Gold Coast Colony
James Bryant Lindley, Esq., in recognition of services rendered in connection with Refugees in South Africa
George Francis Birt Jenner, Esq., His Majesty's Minister in Central America
Colonel James Moncrieff Grierson, Royal Artillery, CB, MVO, late Military Attaché to His Majesty's Embassy in Berlin
Robert Drummond Hay, Esq., His Majesty's Consul-General at Beirut
Dr. Henri Angst, His Majesty's Consul-General at Zurich
William John Archer, Esq., His Majesty's Consul at Bangkok
Frederick John Jackson, Esq., CB, Deputy-Commissioner in the East Africa Protectorate
Captain Harry Edward Spiller Cordeaux, His Majesty's Vice-Consul at Berbera
Major Percy Molesworth Sykes, 2nd Dragoon Guards, for services rendered while His Majesty's Consul for Kerman and Balochistan
Captain Arthur Calvert Clarke, Royal Navy, for services in China
Captain Chapman James Clare, South Australian Naval Defence Force, for services in China
Commander Ernest Frederic Augustus Gaunt, Royal Navy, for services in China
Commander Percy Cullen, Royal Navy, for services in the British Central Africa Protectorate

It had been the King's intention to have conferred the Companionship of the Order of St Michael and St George on the late Honourable George Leake, KC, Premier of the State of Western Australia

Honorary Companion of the Order of St Michael and St George
Herr Ignaz Brüll, His Majesty's Consul at Budapest

Order of the Indian Empire

Knights Grand Commander of the Order of the Indian Empire (GCIE)
His Highness Sir Sultan Muhammad Shah, Aga Khan, KCIE, of Bombay
Sir Henry Waterfield, KCSI, CB, Secretary in the Financial Department of the India Office

Knights Commander of the Order of the Indian Empire (KCIE)
His Highness Maharaja Dhiraj Sipahdar-ul-Mulk Malkan Singh Bahadur of Charkhari, in Bundelkhand
Maharaja Rameshwar Singh Bahadur of Darbhanga
Thomas Higham, Esq., CIE, Secretary to the Government of India in the Public Works Department, Irrigation Branch
Colonel Samuel Swinton Jacob, CIE, Indian Staff Corps, Superintending Engineer, Jaipur

Honorary Knight Commander of the Order of the Indian Empire
His Excellency Hossein Qoli Khan, Mokhber-ol Douleh II (since 1897; known before under his previous title "Mukhber-ul-Mulk"), Persian Minister of Telegraphs

Companion of the Order of the Indian Empire (CIE)
Rao Bahadur C. Jambulingam Mudaliar, Additional Member of the Council of the Governor of Fort St. George (Madras), for making Laws and Regulations
Alexander Porteous, Esq., Indian Civil Service
Lieutenant-Colonel Thomas Elwood Lindsay Bate, Indian Medical Service
The Honourable Lockhart Matthew St. Clair, Superintending Engineer and Officiating Secretary to the Chief Commissioners of the Central Provinces, in the Public Works Department
John Benton, Esq., lately Officiating Chief Engineer and Secretary to the Government of Burma, in the Public Works Department
Marshall Reid, Esq., of Bombay
Rao Bahadur Pandit Sukhdeo Parshad, Member of the State Council of Jodhpur, in Rajputana
Stuart Mitford Fraser, Esq., Indian Civil Service
John Gordon Lorimer, Esq., Indian Civil Service
Major Herbert Lionel Showers, Indian Staff Corps, Political Agent, Kalat
Major Percy Zachariah Cox, Indian Staff Corps, Political Agent, Muscat
Babu Nalin Bihari Sircar, a Commissioner for the Port of Calcutta
Major-General Francis Edward Archibald Chamier, Honorary Secretary to the Stranger's Home for Asiatics

Kaisar-i-Hind Medal

Gold medal
Raja Bhagwan Bakhsh Singh of Amethi, Sultanpur, Oudh
John Montriou Campion, Esq., Secretary to the Government of the Punjab, in the Public Works Department
Captain Thomas William Archer Fullerton, MB, Indian Medical Service
Wilfred Henry Luck, Esq., District Superintendent of Police, Khandesh, Bombay Presidency
Charles Evelyn Arbuthnot Evelyn Oldham, Esq., Indian Civil Service
Lieutenant-Colonel John Leopold Poynder, Indian Medical Service
Taw Sein Ko, Esq., MRAS, FAI, FSA, Government Archaeologist, Burma
Edgar Thurston, Esq., LRCP, Superintendent, Government Central Museum, Madras

Imperial Service Order

His Majesty has been pleased to institute a Decoration for Members of the Civil Service to be conferred after Long and Meritorious Service, and to be known as the Imperial Service Order.

Appointments in the Army

Field Marshals
General Sir Henry Wylie Norman, GCB, GCMG, CIE, Indian Staff Corps, Governor of the Royal Hospital Chelsea
General His Royal Highness Arthur William Patrick Albert, Duke of Connaught and Strathearn, KG, KT, KP, GCB, GCSI, GCMG, GCIE, GCVO, Commanding the Forces in Ireland and Commander Third Army Corps

General
 His Royal Highness George Frederick Ernest Albert, Prince of Wales, KG, KT, KP, GCMG, GCVO,

Aides-de-camp to the King
Yeomanry
Lieutenant-Colonel and Honorary Colonel Aldred Frederick George Beresford Lumley, 10th Earl of Scarbrough, Yorkshire Dragoons (Queen's Own) Yeomanry
Lieutenant-Colonel and Honorary Colonel Hugh de Grey Seymour, 6th Marquess of Hertford, Warwickshire Imperial Yeomanry
Militia
Lieutenant-Colonel and Honorary Colonel Lord Algernon Malcolm Arthur Percy (Colonel in the Volunteer Force), 5th Battalion the Northumberland Fusiliers and Tyne Volunteer Infantry Brigade
Lieutenant-Colonel Sir Hector Munro, 11th Baronet, 3rd Battalion Seaforth Highlanders (Ross-shire Buffs, The Duke of Albany's)
Volunteers
Lieutenant-Colonel and Honorary Colonel Ernest Villiers, 1st Surrey (South London) Volunteer Rifle Corps
Lieutenant-Colonel Commandant George Edward John Mowbray Rous, 3rd Earl of Stradbroke, 1st Norfolk Garrison Artillery (Volunteers)

References
The Coronation Honours, The Times (London), 26 June 1902, pp. 5–6
Coronation Honours – A Long List – Many Australians Included, Morning Bulletin (Rockhampton, Queensland), 27 June 1902, page 5
Coronation Honours, Otago Witness (New Zealand), 2 July 1902, Page 15

1902 in the United Kingdom
1902 awards
1902